"" is the 9th single released by Japanese punk/rock singer Hitomi Takahashi under the Sony Records (gr8! records) label, and is her first release for 2008 and since her graduation from high school. This single was released over seven months after her album Bamboo Collage, and over eight months after her last single. Tsuyoku Nare

Overview 
"" is the 9th single release by Japanese punk singer, Hitomi Takahashi, and her first single since 2005's "Aozora no Namida" to not be produced by Takuya. The title song was used as the first opening theme song for the anime Toshokan Sensō, which began airing on April 10. The song is said to be related to Takahashi's recent move from her hometown of Sendai to Tokyo, and the lyrics were written by Takahashi herself. Also, the coupling track for the single, "mother's car", was used as the ending theme song of the NHK TV show "Digital Stadium". In all, the single contained a total of three tracks, and came with a limited edition sticker for first pressings of the CD. This single also marks the first time all the song lyrics on the single were written solely by Takahashi.

Track listing 
 "" - 4:49   Lyrics by Hitomi Takahashi  Music by Satoru Hiraide  Arranged by Satoru Hiraide 
 "mother's car" - 4:25   Lyrics by Hitomi Takahashi  Music by Satoru Hiraide  Arranged by Satoru Hiraide 
 "" - 3:39   Lyrics by Hitomi Takahashi  Music by Satoru Hiraide  Arranged by Satoru Hiraide

Personnel 
 Hitomi Takahashi – vocals

Production 
 Mixing - Satoru Hiraide
 Guitar & Bass technician - Kazutaka Minemori
 Art Direction & Design - Rie Kategawa
 Photography - Takayuki Abe
 Hair & Make-up - Yohji Fujihara
 Stylist - Mika Nagasawa

Performances
March 29, 2008 - Sotsu Fess

Charts
Oricon Sales Chart (Japan)

Oricon Chart Positions

References 

2008 singles
Hitomi Takahashi (singer) songs
Songs written by Hitomi Takahashi (singer)
2008 songs
Gr8! Records singles